Sérgio Benvindo Júnior, born 1989, is a Swedish contemporary dancer. Born in Brazil, he moved to Västerås when he was 7 years old. Lives in Stockholm. He first began to dance disco. Later he danced a lot of contemporary and jazz dance.

So You Think You Can Dance — Scandinavia
Júnior tried out for the show So You Think You Can Dance — Scandinavia 2008. He auditioned in Stockholm to "Alibi" by David Gray and made it straight to the workshop. From the workshop, he made it to the top 24 where he tried dancing with Mona-Jeanette Berntsen, Emma Hedlund, Trinh Nguyen, Siv Gaustad, Martin Gæbe and Daniel Koivunen, with such dance styles as Afro-Cuban Rumba, Show, Salsa, Broadway, Contemporary, Hip-hop, Cha cha cha, Jazz and Disco.

Green note means bottom three/six
Black note means no partners

References 

Brazilian emigrants to Sweden
Swedish male dancers
Swedish people of Brazilian descent
Dansefeber contestants
So You Think You Can Dance contestants
1989 births
Living people
Contemporary dancers
Jazz dancers